Sarah Michael (born 22 July 1990) is a Nigerian football who plays for Elitettan club Lidköpings. who plays as a striker.

She is a member of the Nigerian national team, and took part in the 2008 Summer Olympics and the 2011 World Cup.

References

External links
 
 
 

1990 births
Living people
Nigerian women's footballers
Expatriate women's footballers in Sweden
Nigerian expatriate footballers
Nigerian expatriate sportspeople in Sweden
Footballers at the 2008 Summer Olympics
Olympic footballers of Nigeria
2011 FIFA Women's World Cup players
KIF Örebro DFF players
Damallsvenskan players
Djurgårdens IF Fotboll (women) players
Piteå IF (women) players
Nigeria women's international footballers
Women's association football forwards
Elitettan players
Sportspeople from Ibadan